The Chain Clinks is a 1923 German silent film directed by Paul L. Stein and starring Ressel Orla, Alfons Fryland, and Grete Diercks.

The film's sets were designed by the art director Fritz Lederer.

Cast
Ressel Orla
Alfons Fryland
Grete Diercks
Kurt Brenkendorf
Leonhard Haskel
Hans Merkwitz
Ursula Nest
Frida Richard
Fritz Richard
Eduard Rothauser
Walter Steinbeck

References

External links

Films of the Weimar Republic
German silent feature films
Films directed by Paul L. Stein
German black-and-white films
1920s German films